The 2011–12 Liga Națională was the 54th season of Romanian Handball League, the top-level men's professional handball league. The league comprises 14 teams. HCM Constanța were the defending champions, for the fourth time in a row.

Standings 

Liga Națională (men's handball)
2011 in Romanian sport
2012 in Romanian sport
2011–12 domestic handball leagues